Shree Shivapur Higher Secondary School is a higher secondary school located in Makrahar, Rupandehi District, Nepal. 
The school celebrated its 50th anniversary in 2011.

One of the faculty is a member of the Nepal English Language Teachers Association.

References

Rupandehi District
Secondary schools in Nepal
Educational institutions established in 1961
1961 establishments in Nepal